"Try Me" is a song recorded by Canadian singer the Weeknd, taken from his first EP, My Dear Melancholy, released on March 30, 2018. The song was written by the Weeknd, Ahmad Balshe, Jason Quenneville, Adam Feeney, Michael Williams and Marquel Middlebrooks. It was produced by Mike Will Made It, Marz, Frank Dukes, and DaHeala.

Lyrics
The song's lyrics revolve around the Weeknd attempting to have a partner leave their current love interest to return to him. Various bars in the song were previously utilized in his cover of Beyoncé's "Drunk in Love".

Vertical video
On March 30, 2018, a Spotify exclusive vertical video for the song was released alongside one for "Call Out My Name" It was filmed during night time in Los Angeles, California. and has been uploaded to YouTube on March 30, 2021, to celebrate the third anniversary of the release of My Dear Melancholy,.

Commercial performance
The song debuted at number 26 on the US Billboard Hot 100 on the issue dated April 7, 2018.

Remix
On August 23, 2018, a remix of the song featuring Quavo, Swae Lee, and Trouble, premiered on the second episode of the Weeknd's Beats 1 radio show Memento Mori. It was described as the show's highlight upon release.

Charts

Weekly charts

Year-end charts

Certifications

References

External links
 

2018 songs
Songs written by Frank Dukes
Songs written by the Weeknd
Songs written by Belly (rapper)
Songs written by Mike Will Made It
Songs written by DaHeala
The Weeknd songs
Contemporary R&B ballads
Song recordings produced by Frank Dukes
Vertically-oriented music videos